These are the profiles for the individual stages in the 2011 Vuelta a España, with Stage 1 on 20 August, and Stage 11 on 31 August.

Stage 1
20 August 2011 — Benidorm,  team time trial (TTT)

The Vuelta started with a team time trial in the coastal town of Benidorm. A number of events left the team at one point with four riders, with a team's time recorded when a fifth rider passes the finish line. Xabier Zandio recovered to join his four teammates out front, limiting any further time loss. 's leader, the defending champion, Vincenzo Nibali gained 21 seconds on Joaquim Rodríguez with  finishing 10th, 24 seconds on Igor Antón's  and 28 seconds on Michele Scarponi's .

Jakob Fuglsang was the first Leopard Trek rider who crossed the finish line, giving him the first red jersey and his first jersey at a Grand Tour.

Stage 2
21 August 2011 — La Nucia to Playas de Orihuela, 

The breakaway of the day was formed by four riders: Steve Houanard, Paul Martens, Adam Hansen and Jesús Rosendo. The only categorized climb of the day was won by Martens, giving him the first blue polka dot jersey. Daniele Bennati moved into the red jersey due to his sixth position on the stage, taking the jersey from teammate Jakob Fuglsang. Sutton claimed the first green jersey, while Rosendo earned the white jersey for the combination classification.

Stage 3
22 August 2011 — Petrer to Totana, 

Later, Edet had some medical problems and never rejoined the breakaway. With  to go, Lastras attacked on the last slopes of the third category climb Alto de la Santa. By the time Lastras reached the top of the climb, he had 20 seconds in front of the remaining three riders from the breakaway, and two minutes ahead of the peloton. Lastras successfully maintained his advantage and won the stage by fifteen seconds, his first stage win at La Vuelta since 2002, and third of his career. Chavanel won the sprint finish for second place ahead of Irizar and Pidgornyy. The peloton, with all the race favourites in it, finished 1' 43" down on Lastras; Lastras' advantage over the main field gave him his first Grand Tour jersey, as well as the other sub-classification jerseys.

Stage 4
23 August 2011 — Baza to Sierra Nevada,

Stage 5
24 August 2011 — Sierra Nevada to Valdepeñas de Jaén,

Stage 6
25 August 2011 — Úbeda to Córdoba,

Stage 7
26 August 2011 — Almadén to Talavera de la Reina,

Stage 8
27 August 2011 — Talavera de la Reina to San Lorenzo de El Escorial,

Stage 9
28 August 2011 — Villacastín to Sierra de Béjar – La Covatilla,

Stage 10
29 August 2011 — Salamanca,  individual time trial (ITT)

Stage 11
31 August 2011 — Verín to Estación de Esquí Alto de la Manzaneda,

Footnotes

References

, Stage 1 To Stage 11
Vuelta a España stages